"Rockchester" is a single by the British industrial hip-hop group Fats Comet, released in January 1987 on World Records.

Release and reception 
In the August 1986 issue of Spin, columnist John Leland described the song as "the best dance music now being made" The single entered the UK Indie Chart in 1987, remaining there for eleven weeks and peaking at No. 6. The song's B-side later appeared on the retrospective compilation album Power Inc. Vol. 1, released in 1994.

In 1997, Future Sound of London released the hit single We Have Explosive, part three of which interpolates a looped sample of "Rockchester".

Formats and track listing 
All songs written by Keith LeBlanc, Skip McDonald, Adrian Sherwood and Doug Wimbish
UK 12" single (WR006)
"Rockchester" – 6:16
"OK Bye!" – 5:18

Personnel 

Musicians
Keith LeBlanc – drums, percussion
Skip McDonald – guitar
Adrian Sherwood – sampler, programming
Bim Sherman – additional vocals
Doug Wimbish – bass guitar

Technical personnel
Kevin Metcalfe – mastering
George Tashiro – editing

Charts

References

External links 
 

1987 songs
1987 singles
Fats Comet songs
Songs written by Keith LeBlanc
Songs written by Adrian Sherwood